Sport Lisboa e Benfica, commonly known as Benfica, was one of the most important archery teams in Portugal. Benfica's archery section was opened in 1949 and won several titles at regional, national and international level. Some of the club's titles include nine Portuguese championships, one Portuguese Cup and one Tornoi Européen de Nîmes FITA.

Their last titles were won in 2010 with Nuno Pombo in men's seniors, and with Armindo Cera in veterans' class, both at recurve bow.

References

 
Archery
1949 establishments in Portugal
Archery organizations